Jet ski or Jet skiing at the 2018 Asian Games was held at Ancol Beach, Jakarta, Indonesia, from 23 to 26 August 2018 and consisted of four events, all events are mixed.

There were three closed course events in the competition, runabout limited, runabout 1100 stock and ski modified plus one endurance event.

Schedule

Medalists

Medal table

Participating nations
A total of 33 athletes from 9 nations competed in jet ski at the 2018 Asian Games:

References

Results Book

External links
Jet ski at the 2018 Asian Games
Official Result Book – JetSki Sport

 
2018
2018 Asian Games events